Novogrudsky Uyezd was one of the uyezds of Minsk Governorate and the Governorate-General of Minsk of the Russian Empire and then of Byelorussian Soviet Socialist Republic with its seat in Novogrudok. It was established 1793 and in 1924 abolished by Soviet authorities.

History
From 1796 to 1801 it was part of Lithuania Governorate and from 1801 to 1843 of Grodno Governorate.

Demographics
At the time of the Russian Empire Census of 1897, Novogrudsky Uyezd had a population of 247,320. Of these, 83.7% spoke Belarusian, 12.3% Yiddish, 1.7% Polish, 1.6% Russian, 0.4% Tatar, 0.2% Ukrainian and 0.1% German as their native language.

References

 
Uezds of Minsk Governorate
Uezds of Grodno Governorate
Uezds of Lithuania Governorate